Prudki is a rural locality (a khutor) in Mikhaylovka Urban Okrug, Volgograd Oblast, Russia. The population was 62 as of 2010. There are 5 streets.

Geography 
Prudki is located 19 km west of Mikhaylovka. Katasonov is the nearest rural locality.

References 

Rural localities in Mikhaylovka urban okrug